This is a list of the most populous cities in Indonesia. It excludes urban-characterized settlements such as regency seats, which does not have city status. Indonesia has 93 cities classified as kota (city) and one provincial-level capital city. Population figures are taken from the 2020 census by Statistics Indonesia (BPS).

Jakarta is the largest city and the only megacity in Indonesia, with a population of 10.56 million. As a primate city, Jakarta is nearly four times larger than the second largest city Surabaya. Jakarta's status is unique compared to other cities in Indonesia, since it is technically a province with a city management. It is subdividied into five administrative cities and an administrative regency, which are not self-governed (without municipal council nor government budget). All five of Jakarta's satellite cities also have passed one million mark in population, with the largest one being Bekasi.

The other largest cities by region include Medan (Sumatra, also the largest outside of Java), Samarinda (Kalimantan), Denpasar (Lesser Sunda Islands), Makassar (Sulawesi), Ambon (Maluku Islands), and Jayapura (Western New Guinea). Jayapura is also the fastest-growing city Indonesia, at 55.23% in a decade.

Most of the provinces' largest cities in Indonesia are also their capital cities. The exceptions are Bekasi (West Java), Tangerang (Banten), Batam (Riau Islands), Banjarmasin (South Kalimantan), Tarakan (North Kalimantan), and Ternate (North Maluku).

Cities by population
Bold: province's capital city
Italics: province's largest city

Gallery

See also

 List of metropolitan areas in Indonesia

References

Cities, Population
Indonesia
Indonesian, Population
Indonesia